Shōma, Shoma or Shouma (written: 翔馬, 翔雅, 匠馬, 正馬, 昌磨 or 聖真) is a masculine Japanese given name. Notable people with the name include:

, Japanese footballer
, Japanese footballer
, Japanese footballer
, Japanese psychologist
, Japanese figure skater
, Japanese actor

Fictional Characters
 Shoma Enda from the game AI: The Somnium Files - Nirvana Initiative

Japanese masculine given names